Mary Kostakidis (born 1954) is an Australian journalist.  She is the former weeknight SBS World News Australia presenter and was the face of SBS over two decades.

Early life
She was born in Thessaloniki, Greece and migrated to Australia with her family two years later. Kostakidis attended Fort Street Girls' High School, and the University of Sydney, where she studied Modern Greek, Philosophy, French, German and Italian. She was a founding member and first President of the University's Greek Society. She completed a Diploma of Education. Kostakidis was awarded a post-graduate scholarship to study at the Aristotle University of Thessaloniki in Greece.

Before joining SBS, Kostakidis worked as a tutor at the University of Sydney, as a research officer for the Departments of Health and Youth and Community Services in New South Wales and as a court interpreter and a translations editor. She has also hosted programmes on ABC Radio stations 2BL and Classic FM.

During her assignment as an interpreter on the so-called "Greek Conspiracy Case" in the late 1970s, she organised a conversion course for Greek interpreters at the NSW Ethnic Affairs Commission in conjunction with Sydney University Modern Greek lecturer Dr Alfred Vincent, to facilitate a conversion from the formal Katharevousa to demotic or vernacular Greek so that the defendants in the case would be able to understand the language being used. Some years later, Greece also adopted the vernacular as the language of all official documents.

Acting

Kostakidis acted in a children's television series called Five Times Dizzy in 1986 with Rebekah Elmaloglou. She has also appeared in the movies Jindabyne and Look Both Ways as a newsreader.

Career

Kostakidis was a member of the management team that set up and developed SBS Television in 1980 and presented its flagship World News for 20 years, resigning in 2007. Her board and committee appointments during nearly 3 decades at SBS and subsequently reflect a strong commitment to social justice and the arts.

She has served as a member of the Fred Hollows Foundation Board, the Sydney Theatre Board, the National Library of Australia Council, the ResMed Foundation Board, the Advisory Panel of the Sydney Peace Foundation, University of Sydney, the Freilich Foundation, the Australian National University and The Privacy Foundation. She is a former Chair of the Sydney Peace Foundation.

In 2009, Kostakidis served on the National Human Rights Consultation Committee chaired by Frank Brennan. The Committee inquired into the adequacy of the protection and promotion of human rights in Australia, holding consultations in metropolitan, rural and remote areas across the country, and receiving over 35,000 written submissions. They recommended a raft of measures, the most contentious of which was a Human Rights Act. Human rights education was the measure that had the greatest support of those that took part in the consultation, but the overwhelming majority supported human rights legislation. The four member Committee also included Mick Palmer and Tammy Williams.

From 1997–2003, she served on the Advertising Standards Board; in 1993 she was appointed by then Prime Minister Paul Keating to Republic Advisory Committee chaired by Malcolm Turnbull; in the early nineties she also served on the Council for the Order of Australia and in 1992 was a founding member of the James Joyce Foundation Board along with Ed Campion and Don Anderson. She has also been an active member of the Kazantzaki society.

Kostakidis has served as an Ambassador for Beyond Blue and was also a member of the Drug and Alcohol Council, the Breast Cancer Council Advisory Committee and the Constitutional Centenary Foundation.

In 1989, Kostakidis hosted the Ethnic Business Awards, which is a national business award highlighting migrant and Indigenous excellence in business. She went on to host the awards again from 1991 to 1994 as well as from 1996–1997.

SBS

The "Face of SBS"
Kostakidis joined SBS as part of the original management team in September 1980 and worked to set up the Subtitling Unit where she helped to develop its policy and training programme and recruited linguists. She became Director of Programme Preparation where she was involved in developing policies of censorship and classification and the children's programming policy.

Kostakidis was moved from subtitling to help create and to host SBS's flagship evening news service, where her more diverse background and multilingual capabilities changed the face of the organisation. She began reading SBS's weekend news bulletins in 1986 and in 1988 became SBS Television's weeknight news presenter. She was described as an important figure at SBS for 20 years "because she was an intelligent professional with a warm personality who capably took viewers through the world events of the day".

In 1994, she hosted the prime time interview program, The Talk Show. Her guests included Paul Keating, John Laws, Cheryl Kernot, Imran Khan, Betty Friedan and Don Dunstan. 

After being known as "the face of SBS News" for many years, in her final year she only co-hosted the main SBS World News at  weekdays with Stan Grant.

Walk-out and legal action
In August 2007, Kostakidis walked out of the SBS newsroom, furious at changes to the news bulletin, which she believed undermined SBS standards. According to authors Ien Ang, Gay Hawkins and Lamia Dabboussy, Kostakidis was unhappy with "the introduction of advertisements within [news] programs," and her departure "was clearly a big blow to SBS, and signalled for many that the multicultural broadcaster had lost its way."

On 5 October 2007, Kostakidis lodged a statement of claim in the Federal Court of Australia, alleging a breach of contract and contravention of the Trade Practices Act 1975 on the part of SBS. She alleged that she had been bullied by fellow presenter Stan Grant and had been "intimidated and bullied" by SBS managing director Shaun Brown, who was striving for SBS to reach a wider audience and to increase revenue. Kostakidis said she was not consulted by SBS when it replaced her with Grant as principal news reader and interviewer for the World News Australia programme at the start of 2007. She was represented in court by prominent Melbourne lawyer, Julian Burnside.

The matter was settled out of court. On 23 November 2007, SBS and Kostakidis were reported to have reached an "amicable settlement". The financial details of the settlement were not disclosed.

Activism
Kostakidis has a long-standing interest in social justice and continues to engage in public discourse, delivering lectures, chairing public forums and contributing editorial opinion articles in the mainstream press and independent online media.

Julian Assange
Kostakidis has supported Julian Assange. In 2011, she presented Assange with the Sydney Peace Foundation’s Gold Medal for peace with justice. She described WikiLeaks as an "ingenious website that has shifted the power balance between citizen and the state by exposing what governments really get up to in our name". She said the treatment of Assange by the US was intended to "shut down WikiLeaks and criminalise the activity of this publisher". She has criticised Assange's extradition trial in the UK and the media for a lack of interest in the case.

Personal life
Her second husband is Ian Wilcox, a cardiologist. The couple married in Venice.

Links

http://www.smh.com.au/opinion/politics/cutting-assange-loose-demeans-our-nation-20110311-1br15.html
http://www.smh.com.au/opinion/politics/assange-faces-enforced-leisure-to-ponder-folly-of-a-law-passed-in-haste-20110711-1hakb.html
http://www.smh.com.au/opinion/politics/we-stood-up-for-hicks-because-australia-failed-to-when-it-mattered-20110524-1f2e5.html
http://www.smh.com.au/opinion/politics/pms-hard-line-on-hicks-20110618-1g8sy.html
http://www.nationaltimes.com.au/opinion/society-and-culture/a-diversified-media-can-tell-humanitys-myriad-stories-20120305-1uc62.html?rand=1330909363864
https://web.archive.org/web/20121027093205/http://newmatilda.com/2012/03/12/why-independent-media-must-survive-0
http://www.smh.com.au/opinion/politics/aboutface-on-hicks-a-victory-for-the-bullied-20120724-22n3x.html
http://www.smh.com.au/opinion/church-should-submit-to-more-women-in-ranks-20120831-255ic.html
https://vimeo.com/33097419
https://twitter.com/i/status/1489852587071270913
https://twitter.com/i/status/1489853694426247169
https://twitter.com/i/status/1489855150248247299

Awards
University of Sydney, Community Achievement 2012
Monash University, Professor John O. Miller Distinguished Achievement Medal, 1999
University of Salonika, first post graduate scholarship awarded to an Australian student 1977
University of NSW, Speech Competition, First Prize Qantas Round the World Trip, 1972

References

External links 
 Profile on SBS website
 

1954 births
Living people
Australian television presenters
Australian women television presenters
Special Broadcasting Service
Australian republicans
Australian broadcast news analysts
Greek emigrants to Australia
National Library of Australia Council members
People from Thessaloniki